Haramaki may refer to:
 Haramaki (armour), a type of Japanese chest armour
 Haramaki (clothing), items of Japanese clothing that cover the stomach